Sviništa is a village in the municipality of Ohrid, North Macedonia. It used to be part of the former municipality of Kosel.

Demographics 
According to the national census of 2002, the village had a total of 64 inhabitants. Ethnic groups in the municipality include:
 Macedonians : 64

References

External links

Villages in Ohrid Municipality